NA-97 Faisalabad-III is a constituency for the National Assembly of Pakistan. In addition to the areas of the former NA-77, the constituency represents all of Tandlianwala Tehsil apart from the town of Mamu Kanjan, which is in NA-104.

Members of Parliament

2018-2022: NA-97 (Faisalabad-III)

Election 2002 

General elections were held on 10 Oct 2002. Chaudhry Muhammad Asim Nazir of PML-Q won by 63,296 votes.

Election 2008 

The result of general election 2008 in this constituency is given below.

Result 
Muhammad Asim Nazir succeeded in the election 2008 and became the member of National Assembly.

Election 2013 

General elections were held on 11 May 2013.

Election 2018 

Electrol process was scheduled to be held on 25 July 2018, but got postponed due to suicide of a candidate.

By-election 2018

By-elections were held in this constituency on 14 October 2018.

See also
NA-96 Faisalabad-II
NA-98 Faisalabad-IV

References

External links
 Election Commission's official website

NA-077